Brie is a commune in the Somme department in Hauts-de-France in northern France.

Geography

Physical geography
The majority of the soil of the commune is of clay-limestone nature.1/5 of the subsoil is of limestone nature and 1/50 of the soil of sandy nature.

Relief, landscape, vegetation
The village built on the western slope of the plateau dominates the valley of the Somme and its lakes.

Hydrography
The river Somme touches the communal territory at its western extremity. On its entrance into the territory of Brie, the river divides into two arms, which meet soon after.
The water table is located at a little distance from the level of the ponds.

Climate
The climate of the municipality is temperate oceanic with prevailing wind from southwest, northwest and west.

Human Geography

Urban Planning and Land Use Planning
The commune has a grouped habitat. The village of Brie was destroyed during the First World War was rebuilt during the interwar period.

Economic activity and services
Agriculture remains the dominant activity of the commune.

Roads of communication and transportation
Brie is crossed by the road Amiens-Saint-Quentin and the road that connects Saint-Christ-Briost to Mesnil-Bruntel.

History

Toponymy
The name Brie comes from the Latin bria or the Celtic briga, which meant bridge over a river.

Ancient History
In front of the church, presence of prehistoric megalith "the turning stone".

Antiquity
Brie being situated on the Roman road from Samarobriva (Amiens) to Augusta Viromanduorum (Saint-Quentin) at the point where it crossed the Somme river, it is more than likely that there was a bridge there. Traces of Gallo-Roman habitat were found on the municipal territory.

Middle Ages
In the Middle Ages, Pont-lès-Brie and Applaincourt were dependencies of Brie. In 1303, by a charter, Gérin de Saint-Christ sold a wood near Brie in the priory of Lihons-en-Santerre.
In 1344 a certain Jean de Brie was a maid of Péronne.

Coat of Arms
The village coat of arms is "azure to the golden chevron accompanied by three half-flights of silver, those of the head back." The official status of the coat of arms remains to be determined.

Early Modern times
In 1571, the lordship of Brie belonged to the Duc de Chaulnes.
In 1636, the village of Brie was burnt by a detachment of the armies of the king of Spain commanded by John of Werth. However, the revolted inhabitants armed themselves with pitchforks and scythes and rushed at the enemy, preventing them from passing the Somme and forcing them to fall back on Saint Christ. 34 inhabitants of Brie perished in this scuffle.
On a map of Guillaume Delisle, dating from the 18th century, there is a fort defending the west entrance of the bridge.
Brie depended on the election and bailiwick of Péronne, the generality of Amiens and the diocese of Noyon.

During the French Revolution, the hamlets of Pont-lès-Brie and Applaincourt were attached to the commune of Villers-Carbonnel.

In 1814-1815, the coalition armies ravaged the country.

In 1870-1871, the population of Brie underwent the requisitions of the German army, in money and in kind. 24 young people of the commune took part in the fighting, two were wounded.

Modern History
During the First World War, the village of Brie was destroyed.

Politics
The mayor is Marc Saintot, elected in 2020.

Population

In 2017, the municipality had 331 inhabitants, an increase of 1.8% compared to 2007.

See also
Communes of the Somme department

References

Communes of Somme (department)